Windham Township may refer to:

Canada 

Windham Township, Ontario, a historic township

United States 

Windham Township, Portage County, Ohio
Windham Township, Bradford County, Pennsylvania
Windham Township, Wyoming County, Pennsylvania

See also
Windham (disambiguation)

Township name disambiguation pages